William Heath (1795 – 7 April 1840) was a British artist who once described himself as a "portrait & military painter." He was best known for his published engravings which included caricatures, political cartoons, and commentary on contemporary life.

Heath was born in Northumberland. His early works often dealt with military scenes, including colour plates for The Martial Achievements, The Wars of Wellington, etc., but from about 1820 on he focused on satire. Between 1827 and 1829, many of his works were published under the pseudonym "Paul Pry" (the name of an overly inquisitive stage character in a popular 1825 stage comedy by John Poole); also used the pseudonym Argus. He was described by Dr John Brown, biographer of John Leech as "poor Heath, the ex-Captain of Dragoons, facile and profuse, unscrupulous and clever".

Heath helped found an early caricature magazine, The Glasgow Looking Glass (renamed to The Northern Looking Glass after five issues).

Heath created a numbered series of political caricatures between 1830 and 1834 for McLean's Monthly. He died in Hampstead and was buried on the western side of Highgate Cemetery. His grave (no.124) no longer has a headstone or any identifying marker.

The British Museum catalogue has over 160 works by Heath.

Gallery

Works
 Historical Military and Naval Anecdotes (1815)
 The Martial Achievements of Great Britain and her Allies (1815)
 The Wars of Wellington (1819) (Illustrations)
 Real Life in Ireland (1821) (Illustrations)
 Real Life in London (1822) (Illustrations)
 The Life of a Soldier (1823)
 Studies from the Stage (1823)
 Rustic Sketches (1824)
 Illustrations of Heraldry (1828)
 Parish Characters (1829)
 Sayings of the Ancients (1831)
 Fashion and Folly (1832)
 Minor Morals for Young People. Illustrated in tales and travels (1834–39).

References

External links

 Lambiek Comiclopedia article.
 
 
 William Heath Illustration using speech bubbles from July 1st, 1830 issue of The Looking Glass

1794 births
1840 deaths
Burials at Highgate Cemetery
19th-century engravers
English caricaturists
English engravers
English illustrators
British illustrators
British satirists
19th-century war artists
British war artists